The United States National Track Championships are held annually. Organized by USA Cycling, they are competitions of various track cycling disciplines in age and gender categories.

The championships have evolved over the years to include more events for men and women. A scratch race was introduced in 2002, as well as a women's keirin. The men's madison had been held for over a century before a women's madison was first introduced in 2009.

Men

Senior (Amateur)

Senior (Elite)

Under 23

Junior

Madison

Junior Madison

Team sprint

Junior Team sprint

Team Pursuit

Junior Team Pursuit

Women

Senior

Junior

Women's Madison

Women's Team Sprint

Women's Team Pursuit

Junior Women's Team sprint

References

cyclingwebsite.net
2000 Track Champions, USA Cycling
2001 Track Champions, USA Cycling
2002 Track Champions, USA Cycling
2003 Track Champions, USA Cycling
2004 Track Champions, USA Cycling
2005 Track Champions, USA Cycling
2006 Track Champions, USA Cycling
2007 Track Champions, USA Cycling
2008 Track Champions, USA Cycling

2006 elite results, USA Cycling
2009 elite results, USA Cycling
2010 junior results, USA Cycling
2011 junior results, USA Cycling
2012 junior results, USA Cycling
2013 junior results, USA Cycling
USA Cycling National Champions 1965-present

Cycle races in the United States
National track cycling championships